Osagyefo Lenin Ernesto Burton-Godwin (born 25 November 1977), known commonly as Sagi Burton, is an English-born former Kittitian international football defender. In a fourteen-year professional career in English football he made 344 appearances in league and cup competitions.

A former Bolton Wanderers trainee, he began his career with Crystal Palace in 1994. Failing to establish himself in the first team during his five years at the club, he joined Sheffield United via Colchester United in 1999. The following year he signed with Port Vale, where he first found regular football. In 2002, he transferred to Peterborough United via Crewe Alexandra. Four years later he moved on to Shrewsbury Town, before spending the 2007–08 campaign with Barnet. He retired from the game following a brief spell with Rushden & Diamonds in 2008.

Club career
Born of Kittitian and Jamaican descent, Burton began his footballing career as a trainee at Bolton Wanderers, before switching to Crystal Palace on 1 August 1994. He went on to make his début in the Premier League match at Derby County on 20 December 1997. He played the full ninety minutes, in what was a goalless draw at Pride Park. Following Palace's relegation, he played 23 of the club's 46 First Division matches in the following season. Despite this, he was still allowed to drop down a division to join Colchester United for a nominal fee on 7 August 1999. After making just twelve appearances in league and cup competitions, by 15 October he was on his way to back into the First Division after signing for Sheffield United on a free transfer. This spell would prove to be a brief one, and in January 2000 he joined Brian Horton's Port Vale, also of the First Division, again on a free transfer. He made 22 appearances for the Staffordshire club in 1999–2000, and found himself on the scoresheet in home draws with Charlton Athletic and Barnsley. He established himself as "a powerful presence" and "impressive in the air". Despite this, Vale were relegated at the end of the season.

He went on to make 37 appearances in 2000–01, including the club's Football League Trophy success over Brentford at the Millennium Stadium. He achieved this honour despite having been transfer-listed in December. By 2001–02 he was an essential first team player, and played 42 of the club's 53 games in league and cup. Despite this he was not retained beyond the summer, and so promptly joined Crewe Alexandra on a short-term deal.

After just one game in three weeks Burton and Crewe parted ways, and he went to join Peterborough United, also of the Second Division, on a one-year deal as a utility player. He played 33 times for the "Posh" in 2002–03, though it would be Crewe who won promotion out of the division following their second-place finish. He played 34 games in the 2003–04 campaign, as Peterborough successfully avoided relegation, and Burton successfully overcame a hamstring injury and a knee problem.

Appointed as the club's vice-captain, he made sixteen league appearances in the inaugural season of League One football. Missing five months with a shoulder injury, he could do little to prevent the club from suffering relegation into League Two. Recovering from a pre-season foot injury, he made 24 appearances in the first half of the 2005–06 campaign, before making a January move to league rivals to Shrewsbury Town, despite reported interest from Macclesfield Town and SPL side Falkirk. He settled in quickly at his new club, and put in solid performances at centre-back. Despite injury and suspension hampering his first few months at the "Shrews", he still netted four times in sixteen games for the Shropshire club in the latter half of the 2005–06 season. After recovering from a short illness he made 33 appearances in 2006–07, helping Shrewsbury to secure a play-off place. He was a late substitute for Ben Herd during the club's play-off Final defeat to Bristol Rovers. Following the defeat he was released by the club.

After a successful trial, he signed with Barnet for the 2007–08 campaign. He served as vice-captain at the club, but was not retained beyond summer 2008, despite having formed a strong defensive partnership with Ismail Yakubu. In July 2008, Conference National outfit Rushden & Diamonds announced that Burton had signed with them until the end of the 2008–09 season. However he was released in November after making just eleven appearances.

International career
Burton won three caps for Saint Kitts and Nevis in 2004. He made his debut on 2 June, in a 2–0 friendly defeat to Northern Ireland.

In autumn 2006, he turned down the chance to play in the Caribbean Cup for his country, preferring instead to stay with Shrewsbury to play league games against Hartlepool United and Darlington.

Career statistics

Honours
Port Vale
Football League Trophy: 2001

Crewe Alexandra
Football League Second Division second-place promotion: 2002–03

References

1977 births
Living people
Citizens of Saint Kitts and Nevis through descent
Saint Kitts and Nevis footballers
Association football central defenders
Saint Kitts and Nevis international footballers
Footballers from Birmingham, West Midlands
English footballers
Bolton Wanderers F.C. players
Crystal Palace F.C. players
Colchester United F.C. players
Sheffield United F.C. players
Port Vale F.C. players
Crewe Alexandra F.C. players
Peterborough United F.C. players
Shrewsbury Town F.C. players
Barnet F.C. players
Rushden & Diamonds F.C. players
Premier League players
English Football League players
National League (English football) players
English people of Saint Kitts and Nevis descent